The three poisons (Sanskrit: triviṣa; Tibetan: dug gsum) or the three unwholesome roots (Sanskrit: akuśala-mūla; Pāli: akusala-mūla), in Buddhism, refer to the three root kleshas: Moha (delusion, confusion), Raga (greed, sensual attachment), and Dvesha (aversion, hate). These three poisons are considered to be three afflictions or character flaws innate in a being, the root of Taṇhā (craving), and thus in part the cause of Dukkha (suffering, pain, unsatisfactoriness) and rebirths.

The three poisons are symbolically drawn at the center of Buddhist Bhavachakra artwork, with rooster, snake, and pig, representing greed, ill will, and delusion respectively.

Brief description
In the Buddhist teachings, the three poisons (of ignorance, attachment, and aversion) are the primary causes that keep sentient beings trapped in samsara. These three poisons are said to be the root of all of the other kleshas.
The three poisons are represented in the hub of the wheel of life as a pig, a bird, and a snake (representing ignorance, attachment, and aversion, respectively). As shown in the wheel of life (Sanskrit: bhavacakra), the three poisons lead to the creation of karma, which leads to rebirth in the six realms of samsara.

Opposite wholesome qualities
The three wholesome mental factors that are identified as the opposites of the three poisons are:
 amoha (non-delusion) or paññā (wisdom)
 alobha (non-attachment) or dāna (generosity)
 adveṣa (non-hatred) or mettā (loving-kindness)

Buddhist path considers these essential for liberation.

Sanskrit/Pali/Tibetan terms and translations
The three kleshas of ignorance, attachment and aversion are referred to as the three poisons (Skt. triviṣa; Tibetan: dug gsum)  in the Mahayana tradition and as the three unwholesome roots (Pāli, akusala-mūla; Skt. akuśala-mūla )  in the Theravada tradition.

The Sanskrit, Pali, and Tibetan terms for each of the three poisons are as follows:

In the Mahayana tradition moha is identified as a subcategory of avidya.  Whereas avidya is defined as a fundamental ignorance, moha is defined as delusion, confusion and incorrect beliefs. In the Theravada tradition, moha and avidya are equivalent terms, but they are used in different contexts; moha is used when referring to mental factors, and avidya is used when referring to the twelve links.

See also
Buddhist paths to liberation
Bhavacakra
Buddhism and psychology 
Dvesha
Kleshas (Buddhism)
Karma in Buddhism
Seven deadly sins
Taṇhā

References

Sources 
Dalai Lama (1992). The Meaning of Life, translated and edited by Jeffrey Hopkins, Boston: Wisdom.
Dzongsar Khyentse (2004). Gentle Voice #22, September 2004 Issue.
Geshe Sonam Rinchen (2006). How Karma Works: The Twelve Links of Dependent Arising, Snow Lion
 Goleman, Daniel (2003). Destructive Emotions: A Scientific Dialogue with the Dalai Lama. Random House.
 Keown, Damien (2004). A Dictionary of Buddhism. Oxford University Press.
 Lamotte, Étienne (translator). The Treatise on the Great Virtue of Wisdom of Nagarjuna. Gampo Abbey.
 
 
 Rangjung Yeshe Wiki - Dharma Dictionary. http://rywiki.tsadra.org/index.php/dug_gsum
 Tenzin Wangyal Rinpoche (2011). Awakening the Sacred Body: Tibetan Yogas of Breath and Movement. Hay House.
 Trungram Gyaltrul Rinpoche Sherpa (2004). Gampopa, the Monk and the Yogi : His Life and Teachings. Harvard University.

Further reading
 Access to Insight, Mula Sutta: Roots (AN 3.69 PTS: A i 201)
 Access to Insight, Nidana Sutta: Causes (AN 3.33 PTS: A i 134 Thai 3.34; BJT 3.34)

External links
 Transforming the three poisons
 Three poisons on Ranjung Yeshe wiki
What are the three jewels? Buddhism for Beginners

Unwholesome factors in Buddhism